KEFR (89.9 FM) is a non-commercial radio station broadcasting a Christian radio format. Licensed to Le Grand, California, United States, the station serves the Merced, California broadcast area and provides coverage south into northern Fresno where the KFNO signal picks up for that area. KEFR is an affiliate of the reorganized Family Radio network and airs several Christian ministry broadcasts from noted teachers such as RC Sproul, Alistair Begg, Ken Ham, John F. MacArthur, Adriel Sanchez, Dennis Rainey, John Piper, & others as well as traditional and modern hymns & songs by Keith & Kristyn Getty, The Master's Chorale, Fernando Ortega, Chris Rice, Shane & Shane, Sovereign Grace Music, Sara Groves, & multiple other Christian and Gospel music artists.

References

External links

EFR
Mass media in Merced County, California
Family Radio stations